Morné Brandon (born 25 November 2000) is a South African rugby union player for the  in the Pro14 Rainbow Cup SA. His regular position is hooker.

Brandon was named in the  squad for the Pro14 Rainbow Cup SA competition.

References

South African rugby union players
2000 births
Living people
Rugby union hookers
Lions (United Rugby Championship) players
Golden Lions players